Richard Patrick Towell (born 17 July 1991) is an Irish professional footballer who plays as a midfielder for League of Ireland Premier Division club Shamrock Rovers.

Towell started his career with Scottish club Celtic and made his debut in the first half of the 2010–11 season. He then had two loan spells with Hibernian before leaving Celtic in 2012.

Towell has represented the Republic of Ireland under-21, under-19 and under-17 teams

Club career

Celtic
Towell started his career at Crumlin United and in 2007 moved to Celtic. In November 2010, he made his professional debut coming on as a substitute for Jos Hooiveld in the 57th minute of Celtic's 2–2 draw against Inverness, he provided an assist for Paddy McCourt.

Hibernian (loans)
On 25 January 2011, he joined Hibernian on loan until the end of the 2010–11 season. Towell made his debut a day later, in a 2–0 loss to Rangers. He was at fault for the concession of the second Rangers goal, as a misplaced pass allowed Nikica Jelavić a clear chance to score. Despite this bad start, Towell helped to solidify the Hibs defence during the latter part of the 2010–11 season. Hibs manager Colin Calderwood stated in April 2011 that he hoped to sign Towell for a longer period. Towell said in April 2011 that he received abuse from Hearts supporters in Edinburgh derby matches because he was Catholic. However, he also said that this made him more determined to play better. Towell returned to Celtic at the end of the season, having made 15 starting appearances for Hibs.

Towell re-signed on loan for Hibs on 25 August 2011, on a deal due to run until June 2012. He played the first match of his second loan spell only 3 days later, starting as Hibs lost 2–0 to Edinburgh derby rivals Hearts. Towell started to find first-team opportunities limited after new manager Pat Fenlon made several signings in the January transfer window. Two right backs and two central midfielders came in with one other right back going out. However, Fenlon said that once Towell had got his fitness levels up he would be back in the first team picture.

Dundalk
Towell was signed by Stephen Kenny for Dundalk in December 2012, ahead of the 2013 Airtricity Premier Division season.

Towell made his League of Ireland debut against Shamrock Rovers on the opening night of the 2013 season and was hugely influential in Dundalk's second-placed finish that year, scoring seven times in 31 league appearances. He also picked up the PFAI Young Player of the Year award. He won back to back league titles with Dundalk in 2014 and 2015 scoring 11 and 25 goals in the respective seasons, and got his first taste of UEFA Champions League football with the League of Ireland champions. He scored in the 2014–15 UEFA Europa League at Jeunesse Esch Jeunesse Esch-Dundalk 2015 History | UEFA Europa League.

2015 season
On 9 October, Towell scored an 85th minute equalising penalty against Shamrock Rovers to win Dundalk their second consecutive league title,  and followed this by scoring the only goal of the game in extra time in the FAI Cup Final against Cork City.

Brighton & Hove Albion
Towell signed for Brighton & Hove Albion on 30 November 2015. Towell made his debut for the Sussex club in the third round of the 2015-16 FA Cup on 9 January 2016 away against Hull City where The Seagulls lost 1–0 to a Robert Snodgrass penalty. 
Despite not playing a single league game in the 2015-16 Football League Championship season Towell made an appearance in the 2016 Championship play-offs as a substitute away against Sheffield Wednesday where Brighton were beaten 2-0 and 3–1 on aggregate. Towell scored his first goal for The Albion in a 3-1 FA Cup loss away to then National League side Lincoln on 28 January 2017. Towell's only league game with The Seagulls came against his then future loan club Rotherham United on 7 March 2017 where he came on as a substitute where Brighton won 2–0 at the New York Stadium. At the end of the season Brighton & Hove Albion were promoted to the Premier League.
In May 2017, following Brighton's promotion to the Premier League, Towell signed a deal to keep him at the club until 2019.

Rotherham (loans)
On 31 August 2017, he signed for League One's Rotherham on a season-long loan where he helped them regain their Championship status, winning the 2018 EFL League One play-offs. On 31 August 2018 he returned to Rotherham United for a second season-long loan spell. He made 34 Championship appearances scoring 4 times as Rotherham were relegated back to League One.

Salford City
On 31 May 2019 Towell joined Salford City on a two-year contract. He made his début on the opening day of the 2019–20 season, a 2–0 victory against Stevenage. On Boxing Day, Towell opened the scoring with a "thunderbolt" in a 2–1 win over Crewe Alexandra on Boxing Day, helping Salford to their first victory in five games. On 19 January 2020, he was sent off in a 2–1 away victory against Forest Green Rovers after committing two bookable offences. He scored Salford's second in a 2–0 win against Macclesfield Town on 29 February.

Shamrock Rovers
At the end of the 2020–21 season, it was announced that Towell would be leaving the club to return to Ireland and join Shamrock Rovers. He scored his first goal against ŠK Slovan Bratislava in UEFA Champions League first qualifying round, but Rovers where eliminated 3–2 on aggregate.

International career
In May 2008, Towell made his Republic of Ireland under-17's debut in a European championship match against Switzerland. He gained his second Ireland under-17 cap four days later, against Spain.

Towell made two appearances for Republic of Ireland under-21s in the 2011 UEFA European Under-21 Football Championship qualification campaign.

Career statistics

Honours
Dundalk
League of Ireland Premier Division: 2014, 2015
FAI Cup: 2015
League of Ireland Cup: 2014
President of Ireland's Cup: 2015
Leinster Senior Cup: 2014–15

Rotherham United
EFL League One play-offs: 2018

Salford City
EFL Trophy: 2019–20

Shamrock Rovers
League of Ireland Premier Division (1): 2021, 2022
President of Ireland's Cup (1): 2022

Individual
PFAI Players' Player of the Year: 2015
FAI League Player of the Year: 2015
PFAI Young Player of the Year: 2013
PFAI Team of the Year: 2013, 2014, 2015

References

External links

UEFA Profile

1991 births
Living people
Association footballers from Dublin (city)
Republic of Ireland association footballers
Republic of Ireland youth international footballers
Republic of Ireland under-21 international footballers
Association football midfielders
Crumlin United F.C. players
Celtic F.C. players
Hibernian F.C. players
Dundalk F.C. players
Brighton & Hove Albion F.C. players
Rotherham United F.C. players
Salford City F.C. players
Scottish Premier League players
League of Ireland players
English Football League players
Republic of Ireland expatriate association footballers
Expatriate footballers in England
Expatriate footballers in Scotland
Irish expatriate sportspeople in England
Irish expatriate sportspeople in Scotland
People from Inchicore
Shamrock Rovers F.C. players